Tucumcari is a city in and the county seat of Quay County, New Mexico, United States.

Tucumcari may also refer to:
 Tucumcari Mountain, a mesa near the city of Tucumcari, New Mexico
 , a U.S. Navy hydrofoil
 "Tucumcari", a song by Jimmie Rodgers from 1959